Gaggle may refer to:

 Gaggle (band), an all-girl choir based in London
 Gaggle (software), student surveillance software
 Press gaggle